Valery Twite Nahayo (born 15 April 1984) is a Burundian international footballer who played professionally in Belgium and South Africa, among others, as a central defender.

Career

Club career
Born in Bujumbura, Nahayo has played club football for Atomic, Muzinga, Jomo Cosmos, Kaizer Chiefs, Gent and Mpumalanga Black Aces While playing for Gent in August 2012 he was linked with a return to the Chiefs.

Kaizer Chiefs
Nahayo joined Chiefs on 20 June 2008 after Jomo Cosmos got relegated; he was one of seven players that left Cosmos including Anthony Laffor, Morgan Gould, Reneilwe Letsholonyane, Sydney Plaatjies, Thapelo Tshilo, Dikgang Mabalane and Nkosinathi Nhleko. During pre-season he competed in the Telkom Charity Cup and the Vodacom Challenge and eventually made his official debut on 8 August 2008 in a 4–0 win over Engen Santos. In the same match he got injured when he tore his knee ligaments, after landing awkwardly in an aerial battle.

International career
Nahayo made his international debut for Burundi in 2003, and has appeared in FIFA World Cup qualifying matches for them.

International goals
Scores and results list Burundi's tally first.

References

1984 births
Living people
Sportspeople from Bujumbura
Burundian footballers
Burundi international footballers
Muzinga FC players
Jomo Cosmos F.C. players
Kaizer Chiefs F.C. players
K.A.A. Gent players
Mpumalanga Black Aces F.C. players
Belgian Pro League players
Association football defenders
Burundian expatriate footballers
Burundian expatriate sportspeople in South Africa
Expatriate soccer players in South Africa
Burundian expatriate sportspeople in Belgium
Expatriate footballers in Belgium
South African Premier Division players